T Leporis (T Lep / HD 32803 / HIP 23636) is a variable star in the constellation of  Lepus, the Hare. It is located half a degree from ε Leporis in the sky; its distance is approximately 1,100 light years from the Solar System. It has the spectral type M6ev, and is a Mira variable  — as is R Leporis, in the same constellation — whose apparent magnitude varies between +7.40 and +14.30 with a period of 368.13 days.

The annual parallax of T Leporis was measured by the Hipparcos mission, but the results were hopelessly imprecise. The distance has also been measured using very-long-baseline interferometry and found to be .

Mira variables are some of the major sources of molecules and dust in the Universe. With each pulsation, T Leporis expels matter into space, each year losing an amount equivalent to the mass of Earth. Images of T Leporis obtained with the  Very Large Telescope interferometer of the European Southern Observatory (ESO) have revealed a shell of gas and dust surrounding the star, whose diameter is some 100 times larger than that of the Sun.  Given the great distance at which this class of stars lie, its apparent angular diameter  — despite its enormous size — is no more than a millionth of the solar apparent angular diameter.

See also 

 Mira Ceti

References 

Lepus (constellation)
Mira variables
Durchmusterung objects
Leporis, T
032803
023636
M-type giants